Szemplino may refer to the following places in Poland:

Szemplino Czarne
Szemplino Wielkie